The 1992–93 Liechtenstein Cup was the forty-eighth season of Liechtenstein's annual cup competition. Seven clubs competed with a total of sixteen teams for one spot in the qualifying round of the Cup Winners' Cup. FC Vaduz were the defending champions.

First round

|}

Quarterfinals 

|}

Semifinals 

|}

Final

External links
Official site of the LFV
RSSSF page

Liechtenstein Football Cup seasons
Cup
Liechtenstein Cup